Vincent Lecrubier (born September 20, 1986) is a French sprint canoer who has competed from 2003 to 2016.

Sporting career

Lecrubier won a silver medal in the K-4 1000 m event at the 2009 ICF Canoe Sprint World Championships in Dartmouth.

Lecrubier also finished seventh in the K-2 500 m event at the 2008 Summer Olympics in Beijing.

In total, he won 2 Gold medals, 6 Silver medals, and 1 Bronze medal on Canoe World cups along his career, and won 5 Junior world medals. His French team teammates were Sébastien Jouve, Philippe Colin and Guillaume Burger. Lecrubier won 16 French champion Titles, and 42 national medals.

Education

Lecrubier is an Aerospace engineer, graduating from ISAE in Toulouse, France in 2010.

Lecrubier got a PhD in Computer Science from ONERA, the French aerospace lab, in 2016.

Professional career

Lecrubier worked at the French Ministry of the Armed Forces from 2010 to 2012, and at Airbus in 2011.

In 2016, Lecrubier was elected Vice-president of the French Canoe Federation in 2016, and co-founded the start-up Sterblue in 2016

In 2017, Lecrubier was awarded the French under 35 Sport and Management award. Lecrubier was also awarded the ISAE-Supero Foundation Special prize in 2017.

References

Canoe09.ca profile 
Sports-reference.com profile

1986 births
Canoeists at the 2008 Summer Olympics
French male canoeists
Living people
Olympic canoeists of France
ICF Canoe Sprint World Championships medalists in kayak
21st-century French people